Otto Schweizer may refer to:

Otto Ernst Schweizer, German architect
Otto Schweizer (footballer), German footballer
J. Otto Schweizer, Swiss-American sculptor